Eudesmus is a genus of longhorn beetles of the subfamily Lamiinae, containing the following species:

 Eudesmus caudalis Bates, 1865
 Eudesmus diopites Dillon & Dillon, 1946
 Eudesmus ferrugineus (Thomson, 1860)
 Eudesmus grisescens Audinet-Serville, 1835
 Eudesmus nicaraguensis Breuning, 1958
 Eudesmus posticalis Guérin-Méneville, 1844
 Eudesmus rubefactus Bates, 1865

References

Onciderini